Henry Sullivan may refer to:

Politicians
Henry Sullivan (Australian politician), (1921–1977)
Henry P. Sullivan (1916–2003), American politician
Sir Henry Sullivan, 2nd Baronet, (1785–1814) Member of Parliament (MP) for Lincoln and army officer

Others
Henry Sullivan (swimmer) (1892–1955), American marathon swimmer
Henry Sullivan (composer) from I May Be Wrong (but I Think You're Wonderful)

See also
Harry Sullivan (disambiguation)